This is a list of industrial estates in Nepal.

 Balaju Industrial Estate
 Bhaktapur Industrial Estate
 Birendranagar Industrial Estate
 Butwal Industrial Estate
 Dhankuta Industrial Estate (construction work held up due to technical problem)
 Dharan Industrial Estate
 Hetauda Industrial Estate
 Nepalgunj Industrial Estate
 Patan Industrial Estate
 Pokhara Industrial Estate
 Gajendra Narayan Singh Industrial Estate (Rajbiraj)

See also
List of cities in Nepal
List of companies of Nepal

References

Neoal
Economy of Nepal-related lists